The wedding of Queen Victoria and Prince Albert of Saxe-Coburg and Gotha (later Prince Consort) took place on 10 February 1840 at Chapel Royal, St. James's Palace, in London.

Marriage
Though the Queen, Victoria as an unmarried young woman, was required by social convention to live with her mother, despite their differences over the Kensington System and her mother's continued reliance on Sir John Conroy. Her mother was consigned to a remote apartment in Buckingham Palace, and Victoria often refused to meet her. When Victoria complained to Lord Melbourne that her mother's close proximity promised "torment for many years", Melbourne sympathised but said it could be avoided by marriage, which Victoria called a "shocking  alternative". She showed interest in Albert's education for the future role he would have to play as her husband, but she resisted attempts to rush her into wedlock.

Victoria continued to praise Albert following his second visit in October 1839. Albert and Victoria felt mutual affection and the Queen proposed to him on 15 October 1839, just five days after he had arrived at Windsor. They were married on 10 February 1840, in the Chapel Royal of St. James's Palace, London. Victoria was besotted. She spent the evening after their wedding lying down with a headache, but wrote ecstatically in her diary:

Albert became an important political adviser as well as the Queen's companion, replacing Lord Melbourne as the dominant, influential figure in the first half of her life.

The wedding of Victoria and Albert remains the most recent wedding of a reigning British monarch. All monarchs since Victoria were already married when they ascended the throne, except for Edward VIII, who married Wallis Simpson after abdicating the throne.

Wedding dress

The lace was designed by William Dyce, head of the then Government School of Design (later known as the Royal College of Art), and mounted on a white satin dress made by Mary Bettans.

The plain, cream-coloured satin wedding dress was made from fabric woven in Spitalfields, east London, and trimmed with a deep flounce and trimmings of lace hand-made in Honiton and Beer, in Devon. This demonstrated support for English industry, particularly the cottage industry for lace. The handmade lace motifs were appliquéd onto cotton machine-made net. Orange flower blossoms, a symbol of fertility, also trimmed the dress and made up Victoria's wreath, which she wore instead of a tiara over her veil. The veil, which matched the flounce of the dress, was four yards in length and 0.75 yards wide. Her jewellery consisted of diamond earrings and necklace, and a sapphire brooch given to her by Albert. The slippers she wore matched the white colour of the dress.

Queen Victoria described her choice of dress in her journal thus: "I wore a white satin dress, with a deep flounce of Honiton lace, an imitation of an old design. My jewels were my Turkish diamond necklace & earrings & dear Albert's beautiful sapphire brooch."

Guests

Bride's family
The Duchess of Kent and Strathearn, the bride's mother
Queen Adelaide, the bride's paternal aunt by marriage
The Princess Augusta Sophia, the bride's paternal aunt
The Duke of Sussex, the bride's paternal uncle
The Duke and Duchess of Cambridge, the bride's paternal uncle and aunt
Prince George of Cambridge, the bride's first cousin
Princess Augusta of Cambridge, the bride's first cousin
Princess Mary Adelaide of Cambridge, the bride's first cousin
Princess Sophia of Gloucester, the bride's first cousin once removed

Groom's family
 The Duke of Saxe-Coburg and Gotha, the groom's father
 The Hereditary Prince of Saxe-Coburg and Gotha, the groom's brother

Bridesmaids
 Lady Mary Howard (1822–1897), granddaughter of the Earl Marshal the Duke of Norfolk, later Baroness Foley of Kidderminster;
 Lady Caroline Gordon-Lennox (1819–1890), daughter of the Duke of Richmond and Lennox, later Countess of Bessborough;
 Lady Adelaide Paget (d.1890), daughter of the Marquess of Anglesey, later Lady Adelaide Cadogan;
 Hon. Eleanora Paget (d.1848), niece of the above, granddaughter of the 1st Marquess of Anglesey, later Lady Graham;
 Lady Elizabeth Howard (d.1891), daughter of the Earl of Carlisle, later Lady Grey;
 Lady Wilhelmina Stanhope (1819-1901), daughter of the Earl Stanhope, later Duchess of Cleveland;
 Lady Sarah Villiers (1822–1853), daughter of the Earl of Jersey, later Princess Esterhazy;
 Lady Elizabeth Sackville-West (1818-1897), daughter of the Earl De La Warr, later Duchess of Bedford;
 Lady Ida Hay (1821–1867), daughter of the Earl of Erroll, later Countess of Gainsborough;
 Lady Frances Cowper (1820–1880), daughter of the 5th Earl Cowper, later Viscountess Jocelyn;
 Lady Mary Grimston (1821–1879), daughter of the Earl of Verulam, later Countess of Radnor;
 Lady Jane Pleydell-Bouverie (1819–1903), sister-in-law of the above, daughter of the Earl of Radnor, later Lady Jane Ellice.

References

Bibliography
 Hibbert, Christopher (2000) Queen Victoria: A Personal History, London: HarperCollins, 
 Longford, Elizabeth (1964) Victoria R.I., London: Weidenfeld & Nicolson, 
 Marshall, Dorothy (1972) The Life and Times of Queen Victoria, London: Weidenfeld & Nicolson,  [1992 reprint]
 St Aubyn, Giles (1991) Queen Victoria: A Portrait, London: Sinclair-Stevenson, 
 Waller, Maureen (2006) Sovereign Ladies: The Six Reigning Queens of England, London: John Murray, 
 Weintraub, Stanley (1997) Albert: Uncrowned King, London: John Murray, 
 Woodham-Smith, Cecil (1972) Queen Victoria: Her Life and Times 1819–1861, London: Hamish Hamilton,

External links
BBC audio slideshow featuring her wedding dress

Victoria and Albert of Saxe-Coburg and Gotha
1840 in England
Queen Victoria
February 1840 events
Victoria and Albert of Saxe-Coburg and Gotha